Chandari Junction railway station is on the Kanpur-Allahabad line. Currently EMU/Passenger trains only stop here. There has been a proposal to convert Chandari into a terminal station.

References

Allahabad railway division
Railway stations in Kanpur